Sean Patrick Villanueva is a Filipino speedcuber who placed second in the World Cube Association World Championship 2019 3×3×3 event with an average time of 6.78 seconds, which was 0.04 seconds longer than that of Philipp Weyer who placed first. This finish made Villanueva the youngest competitor to place in the top three of the main 3×3×3 event at 11 years old. He is currently a student at the Ateneo de Manila University and first entered the world of speedcubing competition by placing 201st in the Philippine Championship 2017.

References 

Filipino speedcubers
Year of birth missing (living people)
Living people